Adlan Khasanov ( 25 May 1970 – 9 May 2004) was a Russian Chechen journalist and photographer, killed in action in Grozny.

Khasanov studied journalism at the Chechen State University, and later worked in newspapers as a reporter and photographer. He also worked for Reuters and Radio Liberty.

He was killed during a 9 May Victory Day parade at the "Dynamo" stadium in Grozny, in a bomb blast carried out by Chechen separatists in an attempt to eliminate Kremlin-backed Chechen President Akhmad Kadyrov. The stadium had undergone remodeling and reconstruction, and, according to reports, a bomb placed inside a concrete part of the structure escaped security detection sweeps.

See also
 List of journalists killed in Russia

References

External links
 Workshop in Memory of Reuters Photojournalist Adlan Khasanov
 Report on Khasanov's death - IFEX

1970 births
2004 deaths
Chechen journalists
Journalists killed while covering the Chechen wars
Radio Free Europe/Radio Liberty people
Reuters people
Russian photojournalists
War photographers
Russian people of Chechen descent
Chechen people
20th-century Russian journalists